Creador is a private equity firm focused on growth capital investments in South and Southeast Asia, primarily Malaysia, India, Indonesia, Vietnam, Singapore, Thailand and the Philippines.

Creador is headquartered in Malaysia, with four additional offices in India, Indonesia, Vietnam, and the Philippines.

Established in 2011 by Brahmal Vasudevan, the firm has raised $2 billion of investor commitments across 5 private equity funds since inception.

The firm invests in 5 principle industries including consumer, retail, financial services, business services, and healthcare.

Private Equity Firm 
Established in 2011, Creador raised a total of close to $2 billion from leading endowments, fund of funds, pension funds, banks and family offices across the world.

Milestones and Prominent Investments 
Creador has five funds, Creador I, Creador II, and Creador III, Creador IV, and Creador V with total Assets Under Management (AUM) of $2 billion.

Creador I 
Established in 2011, Creador closed its maiden fund, Creador I, at US$130 million. There were a total of seven investments made in this fund across Indonesia, Malaysia, and India.

Creador II 
Creador's second fund, Creador II closed at $331 million in 2014 and the fund was fully deployed across 14 investments. Concurrently and in 2013, Creador established a dedicated operations and strategy team, known as Creador+.

Creador III 
For its third fund, Creador raised $419 million and deployed it across 10 investments.

Creador IV 
In 2018, Creador closed $580 million for its fourth fund, and fully deployed it across 11 investments.

References 

2011 establishments in Malaysia
Financial services companies established in 2011
Companies based in Kuala Lumpur